Zoltán Sztáray (June 20, 1918 – April 20, 2011) was one of the better known contemporary writers of the Hungarian emigration. He was born in Magyarcsaholy, Kingdom of Hungary (now Cehal, Romania), and died in Portland, Oregon.

Works
 Souvenirs du camp de concentration de Recsk, Paris, 1957
 From Agricultural Labourer to Smallholder, 1936-1956, Brussels, 1959
 The Crushing of Hungarian Scouting, New York City, 1959
 Hungary. A Survey July 1958-July 1959, New York City, 1959
 A természetes szaporodás visszaesése Magyarországon, New York City, 1960
 Hungary. A Survey. P. 2., New York City, 1960
 Books on the Hungarian Revolution, Brussels, 1960
 Bibliography on Hungary, New York City, 1960
 Birth control in Hungary since 1956, Brussels, 1961
 Haraszthy Ágoston, a kaliforniai szőlőkultúra atyja, San Bernardino, CA, 1964
 A bukaresti titkos szerződés. Hogyan adták el Erdélyt az antanthatalmak?, München, 1980
 A recski kényszermunkatábor, München, 1981
 Hudson-parti álom, New York City, 1985
 Haraszthy Ágoston, New York City, 1986

Awards
 István Bibó Award, Boston, 1983
 Jus Humana Award, 1991, U.S.
 A Magyar Köztársasági Érdemrend tisztikeresztje, Budapest, 1991
 1956-os Emlékérem, Budapest, 1991
 Nagy Imre-emlékplakett, Budapest, 1994.
 Elnöki Arany Emlékérem, Budapest, 1996.
 Szabad Magyarországért Emléklap, Budapest, 1999.
 Magyar Köztársasági Érdemrend Középkeresztje a csillaggal, Budapest, 2003.
 A Szabadság Hőse emlékérem, Budapest, 2006.

External links
 Entry in Kortárs magyar írók 1945-1997 (Contemporary Hungarian Writers 1945-1997), Enciklopédia Kiadó, Budapest, 1998–2000
 Sztáray Zoltán: A recski kényszermunkatábor
 Sztáray Zoltán: A bukaresti titkos szerződés

1918 births
2011 deaths
People from Satu Mare County
Hungarian writers
Hungarian emigrants to the United States